John Evelyn Denison, 1st Viscount Ossington, PC (27 January 1800 – 7 March 1873) was a British statesman who served as Speaker of the House of Commons from 1857 to 1872. He is the eponym of Speaker Denison's rule.

Background and education
Denison was born at Ossington, Nottinghamshire, the eldest son of John Denison (d. 1820), and the older brother of Edward Denison, bishop of Salisbury, Sir William Denison, colonial governor in Australia and India, and George Denison, a conservative churchman. He was educated at Eton and Christ Church, Oxford.

Political career

A Whig, he became Member of Parliament (MP) for Newcastle-under-Lyme in 1823, being returned for Hastings three years later, and holding for a short time a subordinate position in George Canning's ministry. Defeated in 1830 both at Newcastle-under-Lyme and then at Liverpool, Denison secured a seat as one of the members for Nottinghamshire in 1831. After the Great Reform Act he represented the southern division of Nottinghamshire from 1832 until the general election of 1837. He was appointed High Sheriff of Nottinghamshire for 1839–40.

Denison then represented Malton from 1841 to 1857, and North Nottinghamshire from 1857 to 1872. In April 1857 Denison was chosen Speaker of the House of Commons. He was sworn of the Privy Council at the same time. Re-elected at the beginning of three successive parliaments he retained this position until February 1872, when he resigned and was raised to the peerage as Viscount Ossington, of Ossington in the County of Nottingham. He refused, however, to accept the pension usually given to retiring Speakers. Denison gave an explanation – referred to as Speaker Denison's rule – as to how the Speaker should exercise his or her casting vote in the event of a tie.

The Speaker's Commentary
While in office, Denison formed the view that the public needed a plain, but complete and accurate, explanatory commentary on the Bible, and consulted some of the bishops as to the best way of supplying the work. Eventually the Archbishop of York undertook to organise the production of the commentary, under the editorship of Frederic Charles Cook, Canon of Exeter. A panel was appointed to advise the general Editor, comprising the Archbishop and the Regius Professors of Divinity of Oxford and Cambridge. Formally entitled The Bible Commentary, it became popularly known as "The Speaker's Commentary". It was first published in England, and subsequently in the United States by Charles Scribner's Sons.

Family
Lord Ossington married Lady Charlotte, daughter of William Bentinck, 4th Duke of Portland, in 1827, but he left no children. He died on 7 March 1873, and his title became extinct.  Lady Ossington died in 1889.

His Ossington Hall estate passed to his nephew William Evelyn Denison, son of his brother Sir William Thomas Denison.

Ossington Street in London was named in his honour.

Arms

References

External links

 
 
 
 
 Papers of the Denison family, held at Manuscripts and Special Collections at The University of Nottingham
 

1800 births
1873 deaths
People from Newark and Sherwood (district)
People educated at Eton College
Alumni of Christ Church, Oxford
Speakers of the House of Commons of the United Kingdom
UK MPs 1820–1826
UK MPs 1826–1830
UK MPs 1831–1832
UK MPs 1832–1835
UK MPs 1835–1837
UK MPs 1841–1847
UK MPs 1847–1852
UK MPs 1852–1857
UK MPs 1857–1859
UK MPs 1859–1865
UK MPs 1865–1868
UK MPs 1868–1874
UK MPs who were granted peerages
Whig (British political party) MPs
Members of the Parliament of the United Kingdom for Newcastle-under-Lyme
High Sheriffs of Nottinghamshire
Members of the Privy Council of the United Kingdom
Members of the Parliament of the United Kingdom for Liverpool
Peers of the United Kingdom created by Queen Victoria
Lords of the Admiralty